The MSU Lossless Video Codec is a video codec developed by the Graphics & Media Lab Video Group of Moscow State University. It was designed to provide space-effective lossless video compression. As of 2007 MSU had the second best compression ratio when compared to many other lossless video codecs, with the better result shown by YULS codec.

Description 
MSU Lossless Video Codec is available as a Video for Windows codec. It can be used from such applications as VirtualDub or Adobe Premiere. Possible input formats are RGB24 (RGB), RGB32, YUY2, YUYV and YV12.

The codec is available free of charge for non-commercial use.  the commercial license is unavailable. The source code of codec is unavailable.

Despite its name, the codec has several lossy modes.

Release history

References 

Video codecs
Lossless compression algorithms